The 1996 Philadelphia Phillies season was the 114th season in the history of the franchise. The Phillies finished fifth in the National League East with a record of 67 wins and 95 losses. They also hosted the 1996 Major League Baseball All-Star Game.

Offseason
 October 6, 1995: Jeff Juden and Tommy Eason (minors) were traded by the Phillies to the San Francisco Giants for Mike Benjamin.
 December 6, 1995: Paul Quantrill was traded by the Phillies to the Toronto Blue Jays for Howard Battle with Ricardo Jordan.
 January 29, 1996: Heathcliff Slocumb, Larry Wimberly (minors) and Rick Holyfield (minors) were traded by the Phillies to the Boston Red Sox for Glenn Murray, Ken Ryan, and Lee Tinsley.
 February 17, 1996: Terry Mulholland was signed as a free agent by the Phillies.

Regular season
The Phillies were hit for the cycle against on July 3 during a game against their rival New York Mets. Alex Ochoa hit for the cycle against the Phillies when the Mets won at Veterans Stadium. This was the first time since 1951 that a player had hit for the cycle against the Phillies.

Season standings

Record vs. opponents

Game log

|- bgcolor="ffbbbb"
| 1 || April 2 || Rockies || 3–5 || Ritz || Fernandez (0–1) || — || 36,751 || 0–1
|- bgcolor="ccffcc"
| 2 || April 3 || Rockies || 3–1 || Grace (1–0) || Freeman || Bottalico (1) || 15,648 || 1–1
|- bgcolor="ccffcc"
| 3 || April 4 || Rockies || 7–4 || Mulholland (1–0) || Rekar || Bottalico (2) || 16,220 || 2–1
|- bgcolor="ffbbbb"
| 4 || April 5 || Reds || 5–6 (10) || Shaw || Borland (0–1) || Moore || 17,318 || 2–2
|- bgcolor="ffbbbb"
| 5 || April 6 || Reds || 4–8 || Salkeld || Hunter (0–1) || — || 17,958 || 2–3
|- bgcolor="ccffcc"
| 6 || April 8 || @ Pirates || 6–3 || Fernandez (1–1) || Neagle || — || 41,416 || 3–3
|- bgcolor="ccffcc"
| 7 || April 10 || @ Pirates || 7–6 || Grace (2–0) || Christiansen || Bottalico (3) || 7,075 || 4–3
|- bgcolor="ffbbbb"
| 8 || April 11 || @ Cardinals || 1–2 || Benes || Mulholland (1–1) || Mathews || 23,412 || 4–4
|- bgcolor="ffbbbb"
| 9 || April 12 || @ Cardinals || 1–6 || Urbani || Williams (0–1) || — || 26,753 || 4–5
|- bgcolor="ccffcc"
| 10 || April 13 || @ Cardinals || 4–2 || Hunter (1–1) || Fossas || Bottalico (4) || 28,913 || 5–5
|- bgcolor="ffbbbb"
| 11 || April 14 || @ Cardinals || 5–6 || Mathews || Fernandez (1–2) || Eckersley || 27,545 || 5–6
|- bgcolor="ffbbbb"
| 12 || April 16 || @ Expos || 6–7 || Rojas || Springer (0–1) || — || 8,510 || 5–7
|- bgcolor="ccffcc"
| 13 || April 17 || @ Expos || 9–3 || Mulholland (2–1) || Cormier || — || 8,728 || 6–7
|- bgcolor="ccffcc"
| 14 || April 18 || @ Expos || 9–8 || Bottalico (1–0) || Rojas || — || 8,316 || 7–7
|- bgcolor="ffbbbb"
| 15 || April 19 || Cardinals || 0–1 || Bailey || Springer (0–2) || Eckersley || 25,614 || 7–8
|- bgcolor="ffbbbb"
| 16 || April 20 || Cardinals || 0–1 || Benes || Bottalico (1–1) || Eckersley || 23,630 || 7–9
|- bgcolor="ccffcc"
| 17 || April 21 || Cardinals || 4–2 || Grace (3–0) || Benes || Bottalico (5) || 32,896 || 8–9
|- bgcolor="ffbbbb"
| 18 || April 22 || Pirates || 3–9 || Darwin || Mulholland (2–2) || — || 17,604 || 8–10
|- bgcolor="ccffcc"
| 19 || April 23 || Pirates || 6–2 || Springer (1–2) || Wagner || Ryan (1) || 19,254 || 9–10
|- bgcolor="ccffcc"
| 20 || April 24 || @ Rockies || 10–8 || Borland (1–1) || Reed || Bottalico (6) || 48,047 || 10–10
|- bgcolor="ccffcc"
| 21 || April 25 || @ Rockies || 7–1 || Fernandez (2–2) || Thompson || Ryan (2) || 48,033 || 11–10
|- bgcolor="ccffcc"
| 22 || April 26 || @ Reds || 2–0 || Grace (4–0) || Burba || Bottalico (7) || 21,842 || 12–10
|- bgcolor="ccffcc"
| 23 || April 27 || @ Reds || 3–2 || Leiper (1–0) || Portugal || Bottalico (8) || 22,555 || 13–10
|- bgcolor="ffbbbb"
| 24 || April 30 || @ Marlins || 2–7 || Rapp || Williams (0–2) || Nen || 15,252 || 13–11
|-

|- bgcolor="ccffcc"
| 25 || May 1 || @ Marlins || 6–5 || Ryan (1–0) || Leiter || Bottalico (9) || 14,672 || 14–11
|- bgcolor="ccffcc"
| 26 || May 2 || @ Marlins || 2–0 || Grace (5–0) || Brown || Bottalico (10) || 14,888 || 15–11
|- bgcolor="ccffcc"
| 27 || May 3 || @ Braves || 6–3 || Mulholland (3–2) || Maddux || Bottalico (11) || 39,697 || 16–11
|- bgcolor="ffbbbb"
| 28 || May 4 || @ Braves || 3–6 || McMichael || Ryan (1–1) || Clontz || 44,429 || 16–12
|- bgcolor="ffbbbb"
| 29 || May 5 || @ Braves || 8–11 || Smoltz || Williams (0–3) || — || 35,471 || 16–13
|- bgcolor="ffbbbb"
| 30 || May 6 || Astros || 5–11 || Drabek || Hunter (1–2) || — || 15,906 || 16–14
|- bgcolor="ffbbbb"
| 31 || May 7 || Astros || 5–7 || Young || Springer (1–3) || Jones || 16,569 || 16–15
|- bgcolor="ccffcc"
| 32 || May 8 || Astros || 2–1 (10) || Ryan (2–1) || Tabaka || — || 16,284 || 17–15
|- bgcolor="ffbbbb"
| 33 || May 10 || Braves || 0–11 || Smoltz || Mulholland (3–3) || — || 27,068 || 17–16
|- bgcolor="ffbbbb"
| 34 || May 11 || Braves || 3–11 || Avery || Mimbs (0–1) || — || 22,823 || 17–17
|- bgcolor="ccffcc"
| 35 || May 12 || Braves || 6–0 || Grace (6–0) || Maddux || — || 32,314 || 18–17
|- bgcolor="ffbbbb"
| 36 || May 13 || Giants || 1–2 || Gardner || Fernandez (2–3) || Beck || 18,758 || 18–18
|- bgcolor="ccffcc"
| 37 || May 14 || Giants || 7–0 || Schilling (1–0) || Fernandez || — || 18,774 || 19–18
|- bgcolor="ccffcc"
| 38 || May 15 || Giants || 7–6 (10) || Bottalico (2–1) || Beck || — || 25,085 || 20–18
|- bgcolor="ffbbbb"
| 39 || May 16 || @ Dodgers || 2–8 || Valdez || Mimbs (0–2) || — || 25,960 || 20–19
|- bgcolor="ffbbbb"
| 40 || May 17 || @ Dodgers || 3–6 || Nomo || Grace (6–1) || Worrell || 54,304 || 20–20
|- bgcolor="ffbbbb"
| 41 || May 18 || @ Dodgers || 2–7 || Astacio || Fernandez (2–4) || Osuna || 51,064 || 20–21
|- bgcolor="ccffcc"
| 42 || May 19 || @ Dodgers || 5–4 || Leiper (2–0) || Radinsky || Bottalico (12) || 38,178 || 21–21
|- bgcolor="ccffcc"
| 43 || May 21 || @ Padres || 5–4 || Mulholland (4–3) || Bergman || Bottalico (13) || 11,954 || 22–21
|- bgcolor="ffbbbb"
| 44 || May 22 || @ Padres || 2–5 || Hamilton || Grace (6–2) || Hoffman || 13,118 || 22–22
|- bgcolor="ffbbbb"
| 45 || May 23 || @ Padres || 5–7 || Sanders || Springer (1–4) || Hoffman || 16,632 || 22–23
|- bgcolor="ccffcc"
| 46 || May 24 || @ Giants || 5–1 || Schilling (2–0) || Watson || — || 11,917 || 23–23
|- bgcolor="ffbbbb"
| 47 || May 25 || @ Giants || 2–3 || Gardner || Williams (0–4) || Beck || 16,874 || 23–24
|- bgcolor="ccffcc"
| 48 || May 26 || @ Giants || 10–1 || Mulholland (5–3) || Fernandez || Bottalico (14) || 26,234 || 24–24
|- bgcolor="ccffcc"
| 49 || May 28 || Dodgers || 9–3 || Grace (7–2) || Valdez || — || 17,186 || 25–24
|- bgcolor="ffbbbb"
| 50 || May 29 || Dodgers || 2–3 (11) || Guthrie || Bottalico (2–2) || Worrell || 24,120 || 25–25
|- bgcolor="ccffcc"
| 51 || May 30 || Dodgers || 3–2 || Borland (2–1) || Worrell || — || 29,287 || 26–25
|- bgcolor="ffbbbb"
| 52 || May 31 || Padres || 2–4 || Ashby || Mulholland (5–4) || Hoffman || 22,110 || 26–26
|-

|- bgcolor="ffbbbb"
| 53 || June 1 || Padres || 3–8 || Bergman || Mimbs (0–3) || — || 27,623 || 26–27
|- bgcolor="ccffcc"
| 54 || June 2 || Padres || 9–8 (12) || Borland (3–1) || Hoffman || — || 32,035 || 27–27
|- bgcolor="ffbbbb"
| 55 || June 3 || @ Cubs || 3–4 || Patterson || Ryan (2–2) || — || 26,320 || 27–28
|- bgcolor="ccffcc"
| 56 || June 4 || @ Cubs || 12–3 || Williams (1–4) || Bullinger || — || 15,431 || 28–28
|- bgcolor="ffbbbb"
| 57 || June 5 || @ Cubs || 6–9 || Adams || Borland (3–2) || Wendell || 18,189 || 28–29
|- bgcolor="ffbbbb"
| 58 || June 7 || @ Astros || 5–11 || Reynolds || Crawford (0–1) || — || 22,585 || 28–30
|- bgcolor="ffbbbb"
| 59 || June 8 || @ Astros || 3–7 || Wagner || Springer (1–5) || — || 23,739 || 28–31
|- bgcolor="ffbbbb"
| 60 || June 9 || @ Astros || 1–2 || Young || Williams (1–5) || Jones || 30,180 || 28–32
|- bgcolor="ffbbbb"
| 61 || June 10 || Cubs || 1–2 || Navarro || Mulholland (5–5) || — || 19,588 || 28–33
|- bgcolor="ffbbbb"
| 62 || June 11 || Cubs || 2–9 || Campbell || Munoz (0–1) || — || 23,220 || 28–34
|- bgcolor="ccffcc"
| 63 || June 12 || Cubs || 4–3 || Fernandez (3–4) || Castillo || Bottalico (15) || 27,287 || 29–34
|- bgcolor="ffbbbb"
| 64 || June 13 || @ Rockies || 1–4 || Rekar || Schilling (2–1) || Ruffin || 48,018 || 29–35
|- bgcolor="ffbbbb"
| 65 || June 14 || @ Rockies || 6–10 || Painter || Springer (1–6) || — || 48,006 || 29–36
|- bgcolor="ffbbbb"
| 66 || June 15 || @ Rockies || 2–4 || Reynoso || Mulholland (5–6) || Ruffin || 48,023 || 29–37
|- bgcolor="ffbbbb"
| 67 || June 16 || @ Rockies || 3–11 || Ritz || Munoz (0–2) || — || 48,041 || 29–38
|- bgcolor="ffbbbb"
| 68 || June 18 || @ Cardinals || 2–3 || Osborne || Fernandez (3–5) || Eckersley || 31,311 || 29–39
|- bgcolor="ffbbbb"
| 69 || June 19 || @ Cardinals || 2–3 || Benes || Bottalico (2–3) || — || 34,612 || 29–40
|- bgcolor="ccffcc"
| 70 || June 21 || Rockies || 4–3 (10) || Borland (4–2) || Ruffin || — || 25,085 || 30–40
|- bgcolor="ccffcc"
| 71 || June 22 || Rockies || 5–4 || Blazier (1–0) || Hawblitzel || Bottalico (16) || 28,604 || 31–40
|- bgcolor="ffbbbb"
| 72 || June 23 || Rockies || 4–7 || Freeman || Fernandez (3–6) || Ruffin || 33,385 || 31–41
|- bgcolor="ffbbbb"
| 73 || June 24 || @ Reds || 0–7 || Portugal || Schilling (2–2) || — || 20,835 || 31–42
|- bgcolor="ffbbbb"
| 74 || June 25 || @ Reds || 1–9 || Burba || Quirico (0–1) || — || — || 31–43
|- bgcolor="ffbbbb"
| 75 || June 25 || @ Reds || 1–3 || Jarvis || Mimbs (0–4) || Smith || 23,369 || 31–44
|- bgcolor="ffbbbb"
| 76 || June 26 || @ Reds || 2–4 || Salkeld || Williams (1–6) || Brantley || 32,286 || 31–45
|- bgcolor="ccffcc"
| 77 || June 28 || Expos || 7–3 || Mulholland (6–6) || Urbina || Ryan (3) || 21,703 || 32–45
|- bgcolor="ffbbbb"
| 78 || June 29 || Expos || 0–1 || Fassero || Schilling (2–3) || — || 22,898 || 32–46
|- bgcolor="ffbbbb"
| 79 || June 30 || Expos || 5–6 || Rojas || Bottalico (2–4) || Dyer || 24,949 || 32–47
|-

|- bgcolor="ccffcc"
| 80 || July 1 || Mets || 6–4 || Williams (2–6) || Jones || Ryan (4) || 20,779 || 33–47
|- bgcolor="ccffcc"
| 81 || July 2 || Mets || 3–2 || Springer (2–6) || Harnisch || Bottalico (17) || 20,890 || 34–47
|- bgcolor="ffbbbb"
| 82 || July 3 || Mets || 6–10 || Byrd || Ryan (2–3) || Henry || 43,158 || 34–48
|- bgcolor="ccffcc"
| 83 || July 4 || Marlins || 8–5 || Blazier (2–0) || Rapp || Bottalico (18) || 17,460 || 35–48
|- bgcolor="ccffcc"
| 84 || July 5 || Marlins || 7–4 || Borland (5–2) || Miller || Bottalico (19) || 46,872 || 36–48
|- bgcolor="ccffcc"
| 85 || July 6 || Marlins || 2–1 || Williams (3–6) || Brown || Bottalico (20) || 22,278 || 37–48
|- bgcolor="ffbbbb"
| 86 || July 7 || Marlins || 4–7 (10) || Mathews || Jordan (0–1) || Nen || 28,183 || 37–49
|- bgcolor="ccffcc"
| 87 || July 11 || @ Expos || 3–2 || Schilling (3–3) || Fassero || Bottalico (21) || 17,546 || 38–49
|- bgcolor="ccffcc"
| 88 || July 12 || @ Expos || 5–3 || Mulholland (7–6) || Martinez || — || 14,322 || 39–49
|- bgcolor="ccffcc"
| 89 || July 13 || @ Expos || 6–2 || Mimbs (1–4) || Cormier || — || 30,215 || 40–49
|- bgcolor="ffbbbb"
| 90 || July 14 || @ Expos || 2–5 || Scott || Williams (3–7) || Rojas || 31,515 || 40–50
|- bgcolor="ffbbbb"
| 91 || July 15 || @ Mets || 5–7 || Dipoto || Springer (2–7) || Henry || 15,549 || 40–51
|- bgcolor="ffbbbb"
| 92 || July 16 || @ Mets || 3–6 || Clark || Schilling (3–4) || Franco || 18,478 || 40–52
|- bgcolor="ffbbbb"
| 93 || July 17 || @ Mets || 2–3 || Mlicki || Frey (0–1) || — || 29,459 || 40–53
|- bgcolor="ffbbbb"
| 94 || July 18 || @ Marlins || 0–7 || Brown || Mimbs (1–5) || — || 16,521 || 40–54
|- bgcolor="ffbbbb"
| 95 || July 19 || @ Marlins || 2–11 || Hammond || Williams (3–8) || — || 19,123 || 40–55
|- bgcolor="ffbbbb"
| 96 || July 20 || @ Marlins || 4–7 || Rapp || Springer (2–8) || Nen || 24,336 || 40–56
|- bgcolor="ccffcc"
| 97 || July 21 || @ Marlins || 12–3 || Schilling (4–4) || Burkett || Bottalico (22) || 20,873 || 41–56
|- bgcolor="ffbbbb"
| 98 || July 22 || Reds || 2–5 || Portugal || Mulholland (7–7) || Brantley || — || 41–57
|- bgcolor="ffbbbb"
| 99 || July 22 || Reds || 3–5 || Smith || Ryan (2–4) || Brantley || 22,808 || 41–58
|- bgcolor="ffbbbb"
| 100 || July 23 || Reds || 3–5 || Jarvis || Mimbs (1–6) || — || 23,100 || 41–59
|- bgcolor="ffbbbb"
| 101 || July 24 || Reds || 1–3 || Burba || Williams (3–9) || Brantley || 27,352 || 41–60
|- bgcolor="ffbbbb"
| 102 || July 25 || @ Pirates || 4–6 || Miceli || Springer (2–9) || Cordova || 12,163 || 41–61
|- bgcolor="ffbbbb"
| 103 || July 26 || @ Pirates || 4–7 || Ericks || Bottalico (2–5) || Plesac || 17,239 || 41–62
|- bgcolor="ccffcc"
| 104 || July 27 || @ Pirates || 2–1 || Mulholland (8–7) || Parris || — || 23,121 || 42–62
|- bgcolor="ffbbbb"
| 105 || July 28 || @ Pirates || 8–12 || Ericks || Borland (5–3) || — || 15,189 || 42–63
|- bgcolor="ccffcc"
| 106 || July 30 || Cardinals || 8–7 || Ryan (3–4) || Mathews || — || 20,166 || 43–63
|-

|- bgcolor="ccffcc"
| 107 || August 1 || Cardinals || 2–1 || Springer (3–9) || Osborne || Ryan (5) || — || 44–63
|- bgcolor="ffbbbb"
| 108 || August 1 || Cardinals || 1–7 || Benes || Mimbs (1–7) || — || 22,934 || 44–64
|- bgcolor="ffbbbb"
| 109 || August 2 || Pirates || 3–8 || Wilkins || Blazier (2–1) || — || 24,505 || 44–65
|- bgcolor="ccffcc"
| 110 || August 3 || Pirates || 7–6 || Bottalico (3–5) || Plesac || — || 22,690 || 45–65
|- bgcolor="ccffcc"
| 111 || August 4 || Pirates || 4–2 || Williams (4–9) || Miceli || Ryan (6) || 25,498 || 46–65
|- bgcolor="ccffcc"
| 112 || August 5 || Pirates || 3–0 || Schilling (5–4) || Neagle || — || 20,337 || 47–65
|- bgcolor="ffbbbb"
| 113 || August 6 || @ Braves || 4–10 || Bielecki || Springer (3–10) || — || 32,036 || 47–66
|- bgcolor="ffbbbb"
| 114 || August 7 || @ Braves || 1–14 (8) || Smoltz || Munoz (0–3) || — || 29,920 || 47–67
|- bgcolor="ccffcc"
| 115 || August 8 || @ Braves || 4–1 || Beech (1–0) || Maddux || Bottalico (23) || 32,401 || 48–67
|- bgcolor="ffbbbb"
| 116 || August 9 || Astros || 1–5 || Reynolds || West (0–1) || — || 21,780 || 48–68
|- bgcolor="ffbbbb"
| 117 || August 10 || Astros || 1–3 || Hampton || Schilling (5–5) || Wagner || 18,486 || 48–69
|- bgcolor="ffbbbb"
| 118 || August 11 || Astros || 5–10 || Kile || Williams (4–10) || — || 24,150 || 48–70
|- bgcolor="ffbbbb"
| 119 || August 13 || Braves || 0–2 || Maddux || Hunter (1–3) || — || — || 48–71
|- bgcolor="ffbbbb"
| 120 || August 13 || Braves || 2–5 || Hartgraves || Beech (1–1) || Wohlers || 25,196 || 48–72
|- bgcolor="ccffcc"
| 121 || August 14 || Braves || 4–1 || West (1–1) || Glavine || Bottalico (24) || 28,206 || 49–72
|- bgcolor="ffbbbb"
| 122 || August 15 || Braves || 5–8 || Wade || Schilling (5–6) || — || 28,011 || 49–73
|- bgcolor="ffbbbb"
| 123 || August 16 || Giants || 4–6 || VanLandingham || Williams (4–11) || Beck || 20,163 || 49–74
|- bgcolor="ffbbbb"
| 124 || August 17 || Giants || 4–8 || Watson || Hunter (1–4) || Beck || 24,522 || 49–75
|- bgcolor="ccffcc"
| 125 || August 18 || Giants || 7–6 || Borland (6–3) || Gardner || Bottalico (25) || 24,480 || 50–75
|- bgcolor="ccffcc"
| 126 || August 20 || @ Dodgers || 3–1 || Jordan (1–1) || Osuna || Bottalico (26) || 35,457 || 51–75
|- bgcolor="ccffcc"
| 127 || August 21 || @ Dodgers || 6–0 || Schilling (6–6) || Nomo || — || 39,502 || 52–75
|- bgcolor="ffbbbb"
| 128 || August 22 || @ Dodgers || 5–8 || Astacio || Williams (4–12) || Worrell || 29,608 || 52–76
|- bgcolor="ccffcc"
| 129 || August 23 || @ Padres || 7–4 || Hunter (2–4) || Worrell || Bottalico (27) || 22,102 || 53–76
|- bgcolor="ffbbbb"
| 130 || August 24 || @ Padres || 1–7 || Hamilton || Beech (1–2) || — || 31,023 || 53–77
|- bgcolor="ffbbbb"
| 131 || August 25 || @ Padres || 2–11 || Sanders || West (1–2) || — || 30,036 || 53–78
|- bgcolor="ffbbbb"
| 132 || August 26 || @ Giants || 0–1 || VanLandingham || Schilling (6–7) || Beck || 8,640 || 53–79
|- bgcolor="ccffcc"
| 133 || August 27 || @ Giants || 3–2 || Williams (5–12) || Bautista || Bottalico (28) || 9,549 || 54–79
|- bgcolor="ffbbbb"
| 134 || August 28 || @ Giants || 6–7 || Dewey || Jordan (1–2) || Beck || 16,223 || 54–80
|- bgcolor="ffbbbb"
| 135 || August 30 || Dodgers || 6–7 (12) || Dreifort || Parrett (0–1) || Worrell || 22,129 || 54–81
|- bgcolor="ffbbbb"
| 136 || August 31 || Dodgers || 7–11 || Valdez || Schilling (6–8) || Osuna || 24,821 || 54–82
|-

|- bgcolor="ccffcc"
| 137 || September 1 || Dodgers || 6–3 || Williams (6–12) || Worrell || Bottalico (29) || 24,959 || 55–82
|- bgcolor="ffbbbb"
| 138 || September 2 || Padres || 1–5 || Valenzuela || Hunter (2–5) || — || 15,263 || 55–83
|- bgcolor="ccffcc"
| 139 || September 3 || Padres || 8–2 || Mimbs (2–7) || Hamilton || Ryan (7) || 16,797 || 56–83
|- bgcolor="ffbbbb"
| 140 || September 4 || Padres || 1–2 || Sanders || Beech (1–3) || Hoffman || 18,754 || 56–84
|- bgcolor="ccffcc"
| 141 || September 5 || Cubs || 6–1 || Schilling (7–8) || Castillo || — || 18,164 || 57–84
|- bgcolor="ffbbbb"
| 142 || September 6 || Cubs || 4–6 || Bullinger || Ryan (3–5) || Wendell || 17,803 || 57–85
|- bgcolor="ccffcc"
| 143 || September 7 || Cubs || 4–2 || Hunter (3–5) || Bottenfield || Bottalico (30) || 18,021 || 58–85
|- bgcolor="ffbbbb"
| 144 || September 8 || Cubs || 3–5 || Navarro || Mimbs (2–8) || Wendell || 27,600 || 58–86
|- bgcolor="ffbbbb"
| 145 || September 10 || @ Astros || 3–4 || Morman || Schilling (7–9) || Hernandez || 12,700 || 58–87
|- bgcolor="ccffcc"
| 146 || September 11 || @ Astros || 10–8 || Parrett (1–1) || Holt || Bottalico (31) || 17,300 || 59–87
|- bgcolor="ffbbbb"
| 147 || September 12 || @ Astros || 1–4 || Kile || Williams (6–13) || — || 16,103 || 59–88
|- bgcolor="ffbbbb"
| 148 || September 13 || @ Cubs || 2–4 || Trachsel || Hunter (3–6) || Wendell || 23,048 || 59–89
|- bgcolor="ccffcc"
| 149 || September 14 || @ Cubs || 6–2 || Mimbs (3–8) || Navarro || Ryan (8) || 36,290 || 60–89
|- bgcolor="ccffcc"
| 150 || September 15 || @ Cubs || 6–1 || Schilling (8–9) || Foster || — || 24,697 || 61–89
|- bgcolor="ffbbbb"
| 151 || September 17 || Marlins || 5–11 || Rapp || Beech (1–4) || — || 15,507 || 61–90
|- bgcolor="ccffcc"
| 152 || September 18 || Marlins || 8–6 || Borland (7–3) || Miller || Bottalico (32) || 17,158 || 62–90
|- bgcolor="ffbbbb"
| 153 || September 19 || Mets || 2–7 || Clark || Hunter (3–7) || — || 16,689 || 62–91
|- bgcolor="ffbbbb"
| 154 || September 20 || Mets || 2–5 || Wilson || Mimbs (3–9) || Franco || 22,001 || 62–92
|- bgcolor="ccffcc"
| 155 || September 21 || Mets || 2–1 || Schilling (9–9) || Harnisch || — || 23,283 || 63–92
|- bgcolor="ccffcc"
| 156 || September 22 || Mets || 4–3 || Bottalico (4–5) || Wallace || — || 27,672 || 64–92
|- bgcolor="ffbbbb"
| 157 || September 24 || Expos || 2–6 || Juden || Williams (6–14) || Rojas || 16,044 || 64–93
|- bgcolor="ccffcc"
| 158 || September 25 || Expos || 3–1 || West (2–2) || Paniagua || Bottalico (33) || 17,544 || 65–93
|- bgcolor="ffbbbb"
| 159 || September 26 || Expos || 2–5 || Daal || Schilling (9–10) || Rojas || 16,587 || 65–94
|- bgcolor="ccffcc"
| 160 || September 27 || @ Mets || 6–5 || Jordan (2–2) || Dipoto || Bottalico (34) || 15,889 || 66–94
|- bgcolor="ffbbbb"
| 161 || September 28 || @ Mets || 2–4 || Person || Maduro (0–1) || Wallace || 16,801 || 66–95
|- bgcolor="ccffcc"
| 162 || September 29 || @ Mets || 9–5 || Blazier (3–1) || Fyhrie || — || 21,975 || 67–95
|-

|-
| Legend:       = Win       = LossBold = Phillies team member

Detailed records

Notable transactions
 April 16, 1996: Rafael Quirico was signed as a free agent by the Phillies.
 May 6, 1996: Rubén Amaro, Jr. was signed as a free agent by the Phillies.
 June 4, 1996: Jimmy Rollins was drafted by the Phillies in the 2nd round of the 1996 Major League Baseball draft. Player signed June 24, 1996.
 June 17, 1996: Mark Whiten was released by the Phillies.
 July 6, 1996: Mitch Williams was signed as a free agent by the Phillies.
 July 31, 1996: Terry Mulholland was traded by the Phillies to the Seattle Mariners for Desi Relaford.
 August 12, 1996: Rafael Quirico was released by the Phillies.
 September 30, 1996: Howard Battle was selected off waivers from the Phillies by the Los Angeles Dodgers.
 August 19, 1996: Mitch Williams was released by the Phillies.

All-Star Game
The 1996 Major League Baseball All-Star Game was the 67th playing of the midsummer classic between the all-stars of the American League (AL) and National League (NL). The game was held on July 9, 1996, at Veterans Stadium in Philadelphia. The game resulted in the National League defeating the American League 6–0. Joe Carter, the Toronto Blue Jays representative to the All-Star Game, received boos from the crowd for his home run that ended the 1993 World Series.

Roster

Player stats

Batting

Starters by position
Note: Pos = Position; G = Games played; AB = At bats; H = Hits; Avg. = Batting average; HR = Home runs; RBI = Runs batted in

Other batters
Note: G = Games played; AB = At bats; H = Hits; Avg. = Batting average; HR = Home runs; RBI = Runs batted in

Pitching

Starting pitchers
Note: G = Games pitched; IP = Innings pitched; W = Wins; L = Losses; ERA = Earned run average; SO = Strikeouts

Other pitchers
Note: G = Games pitched; IP = Innings pitched; W = Wins; L = Losses; ERA = Earned run average; SO = Strikeouts

Relief pitchers
Note: G = Games pitched; W = Wins; L = Losses; SV = Saves; ERA = Earned run average; SO = Strikeouts

Farm system

References

1996 Philadelphia Phillies season at Baseball Reference

Philadelphia Phillies seasons
Philadelphia Phillies season
Philadelphia Phillies